Francis Amasa Walker (July 2, 1840 – January 5, 1897) was an American economist, statistician, journalist, educator, academic administrator, and an officer in the Union Army.

Walker was born into a prominent Boston family, the son of the economist and politician Amasa Walker, and he graduated from Amherst College at the age of 20. He received a commission to join the 15th Massachusetts Infantry and quickly rose through the ranks as an assistant adjutant general. Walker fought in the Peninsula Campaign and was wounded at the Battle of Chancellorsville but subsequently participated in the Bristoe, Overland, and Richmond-Petersburg Campaigns before being captured by Confederate forces and held at the infamous Libby Prison. In July 1866, he was nominated by President Andrew Johnson and confirmed by the United States Senate for the award of the honorary grade of brevet brigadier general United States Volunteers, to rank from March 13, 1865, when he was 24 years old.

Following the war, Walker served on the editorial staff of the Springfield Republican before using his family and military connections to gain appointment as the chief of the Bureau of Statistics from 1869 to 1870 and superintendent of the 1870 census where he published an award-winning Statistical Atlas visualizing the data for the first time. He joined Yale University's Sheffield Scientific School as a professor of political economy in 1872 and rose to international prominence serving as a chief member of the 1876 Philadelphia Exposition, American representative to the 1878 International Monetary Conference, President of the American Statistical Association in 1882, and inaugural president of the American Economic Association in 1886, and vice president of the National Academy of Sciences in 1890. Walker also led the 1880 census which resulted in a twenty-two volume census, cementing Walker's reputation as the nation's preeminent statistician.

As an economist, Walker debunked the wage-fund doctrine and engaged in a prominent scholarly debate with Henry George on land, rent, and taxes. Walker argued in support of bimetallism and although he was an opponent of the nascent socialist movement, he argued that obligations existed between the employer and the employed.  He published his International Bimetallism at the height of the 1896 presidential election campaign in which economic issues were prominent. Walker was a prolific writer, authoring ten books on political economy and military history. In recognition of his contributions to economic theory, beginning in 1947, the American Economic Association recognized the lifetime achievement of an individual economist with a  "Francis A. Walker Medal".

Walker accepted the presidency of the Massachusetts Institute of Technology in 1881, a position he held for fifteen years until his death. During his tenure, he placed the institution on more stable financial footing by aggressively fund-raising and securing grants from the Massachusetts government, implemented many curricular reforms, oversaw the launch of new academic programs, and expanded the size of the Boston campus, faculty, and student enrollments. MIT's Walker Memorial Hall, a former students' clubhouse and one of the original buildings on the Charles River campus, was dedicated to him in 1916. Walker's reputation today is considered tarnished by his racist views.

Background
Walker was born in Boston, Massachusetts, the youngest son of Hanna (née Ambrose) and Amasa Walker, a prominent economist and state politician. The Walkers had three children, Emma (born 1835), Robert (born 1837), and Francis. Because the Walkers' next-door neighbor was Oliver Wendell Holmes, Sr., the junior Walker and junior Holmes were playmates as young children and renewed their friendship later in life. The family moved from Boston to North Brookfield, Massachusetts, in 1843 and remained there. As a boy he had both a noted temper as well as a magnetic personality.

Beginning his schooling at the age of seven, Walker studied Latin at various private and public schools in Brookfield before being sent to the Leicester Academy when he was twelve. He completed his college preparation by the time he was fourteen and spent another year studying Greek and Latin under the future suffragist and abolitionist Lucy Stone, and entered Amherst College at the age of fifteen. Although he had planned to matriculate at Harvard after his first year at Amherst, Walker's father believed his son was too young to enter the larger college and insisted he remain at Amherst. While he had entered with the class of 1859, Walker became ill during his first year there and fell back a year. He was a member of the Delta Kappa and Athenian societies as a freshman, joined and withdrew from Alpha Sigma Phi as a sophomore on account of "rowdyism", and finally joined Delta Kappa Epsilon. As a student, Walker was awarded the Sweetser Essay Prize and the Hardy Prize for extemporaneous speaking. He graduated in 1860 as Phi Beta Kappa with a degree in law. After graduation, he joined the law firm of Charles Devens and George Frisbie Hoar in Worcester, Massachusetts.

Military service

15th Massachusetts Infantry
As tensions between the North and South increased over the winter of 1860–1861, Walker equipped himself and began drilling with Major Devens' 3rd Battalion of Rifles in Worcester and New York. Despite his older brother Robert serving in the 34th Massachusetts Infantry, his father objected to his youngest son mobilizing with the first wave of volunteers. Walker returned to Worcester but began to lobby William Schouler and Governor John Andrew to grant him a commission as a second lieutenant under Devens' command of the 15th Massachusetts. Following his 21st birthday and the First Battle of Bull Run in July 1861, Walker secured the consent of his father to join the war effort as well as assurances by Devens that he would receive an officer's commission. However, the lieutenancy never materialized and Devens instead offered Walker an appointment as a sergeant major, which he assumed on August 1, 1861, after re-tailoring his previously ordered lieutenant's uniform to reflect his enlisted status. However, by September 14, 1861, Walker had been recommended by Devens and reassigned to Brig. Gen. Darius N. Couch as assistant adjutant general and promoted to captain. Walker remained in Washington, D.C., over the winter of 1861–1862 and did not see combat until May 1862 at the Battle of Williamsburg. Walker also served at Seven Pines as well as at the Seven Days Battles of the Peninsula Campaign in the summer of 1862 under Maj. Gen. George B. McClellan in the Army of the Potomac.

Second Army Corps

Walker remained at the Berkeley Plantation until his promotion on August 11 to major and transferral with General Couch to the II Corps of the Army of the Potomac. Although the II Corps later saw action at the battles of Antietam and Fredericksburg, the latter being under the new command of Maj. Gen. Ambrose Burnside, Walker and the Corps did not join Burnsides's Mud March over the winter. Walker was promoted to lieutenant colonel on January 1, 1863, and remained with the II Corps. He fought the Battle of Chancellorsville in May 1863, where his hand and wrist were shattered and neck lacerated by an exploding shell. A record of the 1880 Census indicated that he had "compound fracture of the metacarpal bones of the left hand resulting in permanent extension of his hand". Later in 1896, as the president of MIT, he would receive one of the first radiographs in the country, which documented the extent of the damage to his hand. He did not return to service until August 1863. Walker participated in the Bristoe Campaign and narrowly escaped encirclement during the Battle of Bristoe Station before withdrawing and encamping near the Berry Hill Plantation for much of the winter and spending some leave in the North.

After extensive reorganization during the winter of 1863–1864, Walker and the Army of the Potomac fought in the Overland Campaign through May and June 1864. The Battle of Cold Harbor in early June took a substantial toll on the ranks of the II Corps and Walker injured his knee during the battle. In the ensuing Richmond-Petersburg Campaign, Walker was appointed a brevet colonel. However, on August 25, 1864, as he rode to find Maj. Gen. John Gibbon at the front during the Second Battle of Ream's Station, Walker was surrounded and captured by the 11th Georgia Infantry. On August 27, Walker was able to escape from a marching prisoner column with another prisoner but was recaptured by the 51st North Carolina Infantry after trying to swim across the Appomattox River and nearly drowning. After being held as a prisoner in Petersburg, he was transferred to the infamous Libby Prison in Richmond, where his older brother was also held. In October 1864, Walker was released with thirty other prisoners as a part of an exchange.

Walker returned to North Brookfield to recuperate and resigned his commission on January 8, 1865, as a result of his injuries and health. At the end of the war, Maj. Gen. Winfield Scott Hancock recommended that Walker be brevetted as a brigadier general of U.S. Volunteers in recognition of his meritorious services during the war and especially his gallant conduct at Chancellorsville. On July 9, 1866, Walker was nominated by President Andrew Johnson for appointment to the honorary grade of brevet brigadier general, U.S. Volunteers, to rank from March 13, 1865 (when he was age 24), for gallant conduct at the battle of Chancellorsville and meritorious services during the war. The U.S. Senate confirmed the appointment on July 23, 1866.

After the war, Walker became a companion of the Massachusetts Commandery of the Military Order of the Loyal Legion of the United States. Based upon his experiences in the military, Walker published two books describing the history of II Corps (1886) as well as a biography of General Winfield Scott Hancock (1884). Walker was elected Commander of the Massachusetts Commandery of the Military Order of the Loyal Legion of the United States in 1883 was also the president of the National Military Historical Association.

Postbellum activity
By late spring 1865, Walker regained sufficient strength and began to assist his father by lecturing on political economy at Amherst as well as assisting him in the preparation of The Science of Wealth. He also taught Latin, Greek, and mathematics at the Williston Seminary in Easthampton, Massachusetts until being offered an editorial position at the Springfield Republican by Samuel Bowles. At the Republican, Walker wrote on Reconstruction era politics, railroad regulation, and representation.

1870 Census
While his editorial career was moving forward, Walker called upon his own as well as his father's political contacts to secure an appointment under David Ames Wells as the chief of the U.S. Bureau of Statistics and deputy special commissioner of Internal Revenue in January 1869. On January 29, 1869, Major General J.D. Cox, who had also previously served in McClellan's army and was currently the Secretary of the Interior under President Grant's administration, notified the twenty-nine-year-old Walker that he was being nominated to become the superintendent of the 1870 census. After he was confirmed by the Senate, Walker sought to strike a moderate reformist position free from the inefficient and unscientific methods of the 1850 and 1860 censuses; however, the required legislation was not passed and the census proceeded under the rules governing previous collections. Among the problems facing Walker included a lack of authority to determine, enforce, or control the marshals personnel, methods, or timing all of which were regularly manipulated by local political interests. Additionally, the 1870 Census would not only occur five years after Civil War but would also be the first in which emancipated African Americans would be fully counted in the census.

Owing to the confluence of these problems, the Census was completed and tabulated several months behind schedule to much popular criticism, and led indirectly to a deterioration in Walker's health during the spring of 1871. Walker took leave to travel to England with Bowles that summer to recuperate and upon return that fall, despite an offer from The New York Times to join their editorial board with an annual salary of $8,000 ($ in 2016), accepted Secretary Columbus Delano's offer to become the U.S. Commissioner of Indian Affairs in November 1871. The appointment was simultaneously a go-around to continue to fund Walker's federal responsibilities as Census superintendent despite Congress' cessation of appropriations for the position as well as a political opportunity to replace a scandal-ridden predecessor. Walker continued to work on the Census for several years thereafter, culminating in the publication of the Statistical Atlas of the United States that was unprecedented in its use of visual statistics and maps to report the results of the Census. The Atlas won him praise from both the Secretary of the Smithsonian Institution as well as a First Class medal from the International Geographical Congress.

Indian Bureau
Despite his Census-related efforts, Walker did not neglect his obligations as Indian affairs superintendent.  However, Walker’s frustration with the treatment of Native Americans caused his resignation after only one year on December 26, 1872 to take a faculty position at Yale.  During his brief assignment, he collected demographic information on native tribes and on the history of conflict and treaties, which he published in 1874 as a book titled The Indian Question.  More than half of the book is dedicated to an appendix with descriptions of over 100 tribes which he describes as including 300,000 natives, the majority of which were living on existing government reservations. The remainder of the work proposes policy options for future government actions.

A central theme of Walker’s book is to consider two options for future relationships to the Native Americans: seclusion on reservations or citizenship.   He warns that the current reservation system is failing due to unabated illegal incursion into the native lands.  He provides examples of how the alternative of immediate full assimilation as citizens is damaging native culture, quality of life, and dignity.  Walker’s conclusions are that assimilation as citizens must be the ultimate end goal, but to accomplish this in an orderly manner over time requires protection of the indigenous population “under the shell of the reservation system.”  He proposes detailed recommendations including consolidation of the existing 92 reservations into fewer larger units; laws and enforcement to stop settler incursions; government sponsored training programs within the reservations; and ongoing federal financial support based on an endowment and not annual appropriations.

Walker makes a number of moral arguments to support reparations for past actions toward Native Americans, including :  “We may have no fear that the dying curse of the red man, outcast and homeless by our fault, will bring barrenness upon the soil that once was his, or dry the streams of the beautiful land that, through so much of evil and of good, has become our patrimony ; but surely we shall be clearer in our lives, and freer to meet the glances of our sons and grandsons, if in our generation we do justice and show mercy to a race which has been impoverished that we might be made rich.”  He elevated the treatment of the natives to be one of the great issues of the time:  “The United States will be judged at the bar of history according to what they shall have done in two respects, -by their disposition of negro slavery, and by their treatment of the Indians.”

Other engagements
1876 was a busy year for Walker. Henry Brooks Adams sought to recruit Walker to be the editor-in-chief of his Boston Post after failing to recruit Horace White and Charles Nordhoff for the position. That spring, Walker was nominated to run for the Secretary of the State of Connecticut, running on a platform that would later be embodied by the "Mugwump" movement, but ultimately lost to Marvin H. Sanger by a margin of 7,200 votes out of 99,000 cast. In the summer, the faculty of Amherst attempted to recruit him to become the President, but the position went instead to the Rev. Julius Hawley Seelye to appease the more conservative trustees.

Walker's rise to prominence was further accelerated by his appointment by Charles Francis Adams, Jr. as the chief of the Bureau of Awards at the 1876 Centennial Exposition in Philadelphia. Previous world expositions in Europe were fraught with national factionalism and a superabundance of awards. Walker imposed a much leaner operation replacing juries with judges and being more selective in awarding prizes. Walker won formal international recognition when he was named a "Knight Commander" by Sweden and Norway and a "Comendador" by Spain. He was also invited to serve as Assistant Commissioner General for the 1878 Paris Exposition. The Centennial Exposition affected Walker's later career by greatly increasing his interest in technical education as well as introducing him to MIT President John D. Runkle and Treasurer John C. Cummings.

1880 Census
Walker accepted a re-appointment as the superintendent of the 1880 Census because a new law, spearheaded by Congressman James A. Garfield, had been passed to allow him to appoint trained census enumerators free from political influence. Notably, the 1880 Census's results suggested population throughout the Southern states had increased improbably over Walker's 1870 census but an investigation revealed that the latter had been inaccurately enumerated. Walker publicized the discrepancy even as it effectively discredited the accuracy his 1870 work. The tenth Census resulted in the publication of twenty-two volumes, was popularly regarded as the best census of any up to that time, and definitively established Walker's reputation as the preeminent statistician in the nation. The Census was again delayed as a result of its size and was the subject of praise and criticism on its comprehensiveness and relevance. Walker also used the position as a bully pulpit to advocate for the creation of a permanent Census Bureau to not only ensure that professional statisticians could be trained and retained but that the information could be better popularized and disseminated. Following Garfield's 1880 election, there was wide speculation that he would name Walker to be Secretary of the Interior, but Walker had accepted the offer to become President of MIT in the spring of 1881 instead.

Social Darwinism
Walker was a strong believer in social Darwinism. In 1896, he wrote an article in the Atlantic Monthly titled "Restriction of Immigration," in which he said immigrants from Austria, Italy, Hungary, and Russia were nothing more than "vast masses of peasantry, degraded below our utmost conceptions . . . beaten men from beaten races, representing the worst failures in the struggle for existence."

According to historian Mae Ngai, Walker believed the United States "possessed a natural character and teleology, to which immigration was external and unnatural. [His] assumption resonated with conventional views about America's providential mission and the general march of progress. Yet, it was rooted in a profoundly conservative viewpoint that the composition of the American nation should never change."

Walker's theories and writing were foundational for the American nativist movement.

Academic career

As his Census obligations diminished in 1872, Walker reconsidered becoming an editorialist and even briefly entertained the idea of becoming a shoe manufacturer with his brother-in-law back in North Brookfield. However, in October 1872, he was unanimously offered to fill Daniel Coit Gilman's vacated post at Yale's recently established Sheffield Scientific School led by the mineralogist George Jarvis Brush. While at Yale, Walker served as a member of the School Committee at New Haven (1877–1880) and the Connecticut Board of Education (1878–1881).

Walker was awarded honorary or ad eundem degrees from Amherst (M.A. 1863, Ph.D. 1875, LL.D. 1882), Yale (M.A. 1873, LL.D. 1882),  Harvard (LL.D. 1883), Columbia (LL.D. 1887), St. Andrews (LL.D. 1888), Dublin (LL.D. 1892), Halle (Ph.D. 1894), and Edinburgh (LL.D. 1896). He was elected as an honorary member of the Royal Statistical Society in 1875, a member of the American Antiquarian Society in 1876, and a member of the National Academy of Sciences in 1878 where he served as the vice president from 1890 until his death. In addition to being elected as the president of the American Statistical Association in 1882, he helped found and launch the International Statistical Institute in 1885 and was named its "President-adjoint" in 1893. Walker also served as the inaugural president of the American Economic Association from 1885 to 1892. He took appointments as a lecturer at Johns Hopkins University (its first professor of economics) from 1877 to 1879, lecturer at Harvard University in 1882, 1883, and 1896, and trustee at Amherst College from 1879 to 1889.

Wages-fund theory
Walker's scholarly contributions are widely recognized as having broadened, liberalized, and modernized economic and statistical theory with his contributions to wages, wealth distribution, money, and social economics. Although his arguments presage both neoclassical economics and institutionalism, he is not readily classified into either.  As a Professor of Political Economy, his first major scholarly contribution was on his The Wages Question which set out to debunk the wage-fund doctrine as well as address the then-radical notion of obligations between the employer and the employed. His theory of wage distribution later came to be known as residual theory and set the stage for contributions by John Bates Clark on the marginal productivity theory. Despite Walker's advocacy of profit sharing and expansion of educational opportunities using trade and industrial schools, he was an avowed opponent of the nascent socialist movement and published critiques of Edward Bellamy's popular novel Looking Backward.

Henry George debates
Beginning in 1879, Walker and the political economist Henry George engaged in a prominent debate over economic rents, land, money, and taxes. Based on a series of lectures delivered at Harvard, Walker published his Land and Its Rent in 1883 as a criticism of George's 1879 Progress and Poverty. Walker's position on international bimetallism influenced his arguments that the primary cause of economic depressions was not land speculation, but rather constriction of the money supply. Walker also criticized George's assumptions that technical progress was always labor saving and whether land held for speculation was unproductive or inefficient.

Bimetallism
In August 1878, Walker represented the United States at the third International Monetary Conference in Paris while also attending the 1878 Exposition. Not only were the attempts by the United States to re-establish an international silver standard defeated, but Walker also had to scramble to complete the report on the Exposition in only four days. Although he returned to the U.S. in October disheartened by the failure of the conference and exhausted by his obligations at the Exposition, the trip had secured Walker a commanding national and international reputation.

Walker published International Bimetallism in 1896 roundly critiquing the demonetization of silver out of political pressure and the impact of this change on prices and profits as well as worker employment and wages. Walker's reputation and position on the issue isolated him among public figures and made him a target in the press. The book was published in the midst of the 1896 presidential election pitting populist "silver" candidate William Jennings Bryan against the capitalist "gold" candidate William McKinley and the competing interpretations of the nation's leading economist's stance on the issue became a political football during the campaign. The presidential candidate and economist were not close allies as Walker advocated a double standard by all leading financial nations while Bryan argued for the United States' unilateral shift to a silver standard. The rift was heightened by the east-west divide on the issue as well as Walker's general distaste for political populism; Walker's position was supported by conservative bankers and statesmen like Henry Lee Higginson, George F. Hoar, John M. Forbes, and Henry Cabot Lodge.

Other interests
Political Economy, the first edition published in 1883, was one of the most widely used textbooks of the 19th century as a component of the American Science Series. Robert Solow criticized the third edition (1888) for being devoid of facts, figures, and mostly full of off-the-cuff judgments on the practices and capacities of Native Americans and immigrants, but generally embodying the state of the art of economics at the time.

Walker also took an interest in demographics later in his career, particularly towards the issues of immigration and birth rates. He published The Growth of the United States in 1882 and Restriction on Immigration in 1896 arguing for increasing restrictions out of concern about the diminished industrial and intellectual capacity of the most recent wave of immigrants. Walker also argued that unrestricted immigration was the major reason behind nineteenth-century Native American fertility decline, but while the argument was politically popular and became widely accepted in mobilizing restrictions on immigration, it rested upon a surprisingly facile statistical analysis that was later refuted. Writing on immigrants from southern Italy, Hungary, Austria, and Russia in The Atlantic, Walker claimed,

The entrance into our political, social, and industrial life of such vast masses of peasantry, degraded below our utmost conceptions, is a matter which no intelligent patriot can look upon without the gravest apprehension and alarm. These people have no history behind them which is of a nature to give encouragement. They have none of the inherited instincts and tendencies which made it comparatively easy to deal with the immigration of the olden time. They are beaten men from beaten races; representing the worst failures in the struggle for existence. Centuries are against them, as centuries were on the side of those who formerly came to us. They have none of the ideas and aptitudes which fit men to take up readily and easily the problem of self-care and self-government, such as belong to those who are descended from the tribes that met under the oak-trees of old Germany to make laws and choose chieftains.

MIT presidency

Established in 1861 and opened in 1865, the Massachusetts Institute of Technology (MIT) saw its financial stability severely undermined following the Panic of 1873 and subsequent Long Depression. Seventy-five-year-old founder William Barton Rogers was elected interim president in 1878 after John Daniel Runkle stepped down. Rogers wrote Walker in June 1880 to offer him the Presidency, and Walker evidently debated the opportunity for some time as Rogers sent follow-up inquiries in January and February 1881 requesting his committed decision. Walker ultimately accepted in early May and was formally elected President by the MIT Corporation on May 25, 1881, resigning his Yale appointment in June and his Census directorship in November. However, the assassination attempt on President Garfield in July 1881 and the ensuing illness before Garfield's death in September upset Walker's transition and delayed his formal introduction to the faculty of MIT until November 5, 1881. On May 30, 1882, during Walker's first Commencement exercises, Rogers died mid-speech where his last words were famously "bituminous coal".

MIT's inability to secure a more stable financial footing during this era can largely be attributed to the existence of the Lawrence Scientific School at Harvard. Given the choice between funding technological research at the oldest university in the nation, or at an independent and adolescent institution, potential benefactors were indifferent or even hostile to funding MIT's competing mission. Earlier overtures from Harvard President Charles William Eliot towards consolidation of the two schools were rejected or disrupted by Rogers in 1870 and 1878. Despite his tenure at the analogous Sheffield School of Yale University, Walker remained committed to MIT's independence from a larger institution. Walker also repeatedly received overtures from Leland Stanford to become the first president of his new university in Palo Alto, California, but Walker remained committed to MIT owing to his Boston upbringing.

Aid and expansion
In light of the difficulties in raising capital for these expansions and despite MIT's privately endowed status, Walker and other members of the Corporation lobbied the Massachusetts legislature for a $200,000 grant to aid in the industrial development of the Commonwealth ($ in 2016 dollars). After intensive negotiations that called upon Walker's extensive connections and civic experience, in 1887 the legislature made a grant of $300,000 over two years to the Institute, which would lead to a total of $1.6 million in grants from the Commonwealth before the practice was discontinued in 1921.

Walker sought to erect a new building to address the increasingly cramped conditions of the original Boylston Street campus located near Copley Square, in the increasingly fashionable and crowded Back Bay neighborhood of Boston. Because the stipulations of the original land grant prevented MIT from covering more than two-ninths of its current lot, Walker announced his intention to build the industrial expansion on a lot directly across from the Trinity Church fully intending that expected opposition would lead to favorable terms for selling the proposed land and funding construction elsewhere. With the financial health of the Institute only beginning to recover, Walker began construction on the partially-funded expansion, fully expecting the immediacy of the project to be a persuasive tool for raising its funds. The strategy was only partially successful, as the 1883 building had laboratory facilities that were second-to-none but also lacked the outward architectural grandeur of its sister building and was generally considered an eyesore on its surroundings. Mechanical shops were moved out of the original Rogers Building in the mid-1880s to accommodate other programs, and in 1892 the Institute began construction on another Copley Square building.

New programs were also launched under Walker's tenure: Electrical Engineering in 1882, Chemical Engineering in 1888, Sanitary Engineering in 1889, Geology in 1890, Naval Architecture in 1893.

Reforms

Although Walker continued Census-related activities, he began to lecture on political economy as well as establishing a new general course of study (Course IX) emphasizing economics, history, law, English, and modern languages. Walker also set out to reform and expand the Institute's organization by creating a smaller Executive Committee, apart from the fifty-member Corporation, to handle regular administrative issues. Walker emphasized the importance of faculty governance by regularly attending their meetings and seeking their advice on major decisions.

Walker also sought to improve the state of student life and alumni relations by supporting the creation of a gymnasium, dormitories, and the Technology Club, which served to foster a stronger identity and loyalty among the largely commuter student body. He also won considerable praise from the student body by reducing the required time spent for recitation and preparation, limiting the faculty to examinations lasting no longer than three hours, expanding entrance examinations to other cities, starting a summer curriculum, and launching masters and doctoral graduate degree programs. These reforms were largely a response to Walker's on-going defense of the Institute and its curriculum from outside accusations of overwork, poor writing, inapplicable skills, and status as a "mere" trade school. Between 1881 and 1897, enrollments quadrupled from 302 to 1,198 students, annual degrees granted increased from 28 to 179, faculty appointments quadrupled from 38 to 156, and the endowment grew thirteenfold from $137,000 to $1,798,000 ($ to $ in 2016 dollars).

While MIT is a private institution, Walker's extensive civic activities as President set the precedent for future presidents to use the post to fulfill civic and cultural obligations throughout Boston. He served as a member of the Massachusetts Board of Education (1882–1890), Boston School Committee (1885–1888), Boston Art Commission (1885–1897), Boston Park Commission (1890–1896), Massachusetts Historical Society (1883–1897), and a trustee of the Boston Public Library in 1896. Walker was committed to a variety of reforms in public and normal schools such as secular curricula, expanding the emphasis on arithmetic, reducing the emphasis on ineffectual home exercises, and increasing the pay and training of teachers.

Personal life

Walker married Exene Evelyn Stoughton on August 16, 1865 (born October 11, 1840). They had five sons and two daughters together: Stoughton (b. June 3, 1866), Lucy (b. September 1, 1867), Francis (b. 1870–1871), Ambrose (b. December 28, 1870), Eveline (b. 1875–1876), Etheredge (b. 1876–1877), and Stuart (b. 1878–1879). Walker was an avid spectator and supporter of college football and baseball, and was a regular Yale enthusiast at the annual Harvard-Yale football game, even during his MIT presidency.

Following a trip to a dedication in the "wilderness of Northern New York" in December 1896, Walker returned exhausted and ill. He died on January 5, 1897, as a result of apoplexy. His funeral service was conducted at Trinity Church, and Walker was buried at Walnut Grove cemetery in North Brookfield, Massachusetts. His grave can be found in Section 1 Lot 72.

Legacy

Following Walker's death, alumni and students began to raise funds to construct a monument to him and his fifteen years as leader of the university. Although the funds were easily raised, plans were delayed for over two decades as MIT made plans to move to a new campus on the western bank of the Charles River in Cambridge. The new Beaux-Arts campus opened in 1916, and featured a neo-classical Walker Memorial building housing a gymnasium, students' club and lounge, and a commons room.

Despite his prominence and leadership in the fields of economics, statistics, and political economy, Walker's Course IX on General Studies was dissolved shortly after his death, and a seventy-year debate followed over the appropriate role and scope of humanistic and social studies at MIT. Graduation requirements changed over the years, but have always included some number of courses in the humanities. Since 1975, all undergraduate students are required to take eight classes distributed across the MIT School of Humanities, Arts, and Social Sciences before receiving their degrees. To address continuing concerns about poor communications skills, a Communication Requirement has been added for two of the classes taken in a designated major to be "communication-intensive", including "substantial instruction and practice in oral presentation".

Beginning in 1947, the American Economic Association recognized the lifetime achievement of an individual economist with a  "Francis A. Walker Medal". The quinquennial award was discontinued in 1982 after the creation of the Nobel Memorial Prize in Economic Sciences effectively made it superfluous. The medal was awarded to Wesley Clair Mitchell in 1947, John Maurice Clark in 1952, Frank Knight in 1957, Jacob Viner in 1962, Alvin Hansen in 1967, Theodore Schultz in 1972, and Simon Kuznets in 1977.

Walker's reputation declined in the 21st century as attention was brought to his bigoted racial views. A bronze bust of him was removed from its pedestal and relocated to the MIT Museum, accompanied by a description that describes them as "appalling".

Principal works
  The Indian Question (1874)
 The Wages Question: A treatise on Wages and the Wages Class (1876)
 Money (1878)
 Money in its Relation to Trade and Industry (1879)
 Political Economy (first edition, 1883)
 Land and its Rent (1883)
 History of the Second Army Corps (1886)
 Life of General Hancock (1894)
 The Making of the Nation (1895)
  International Bimetallism (1896)

See also

List of American Civil War brevet generals (Union)
List of Massachusetts generals in the American Civil War

References

Citations

Bibliography

External links
 Biographical note – MIT Archives
 Biographical note – New School
 
 
 
 
 
 
 

1840 births
1897 deaths
American biographers
American economics writers
19th-century  American economists
American Civil War prisoners of war
Amherst College alumni
Boston School Committee members
People of Massachusetts in the American Civil War
Writers from Boston
Presidents of the American Statistical Association
Presidents of the Massachusetts Institute of Technology
Union Army generals
American statisticians
Sheffield Scientific School faculty
American columnists
United States Census Bureau people
Members of the United States National Academy of Sciences
Connecticut Republicans
Massachusetts Republicans
People from North Brookfield, Massachusetts
19th-century American journalists
American male journalists
19th-century American male writers
19th-century American politicians
Members of the American Antiquarian Society
Presidents of the American Economic Association
Mathematicians from Connecticut
Economists from Massachusetts
Trustees of the Boston Public Library
American male biographers
The Boston Post people